Prosapia ignipectus, known generally as the red-legged spittlebug or black spittlebug, is a species of froghopper in the family Cercopidae. It is found in North America.

References

Further reading

External links

 

Cercopidae
Hemiptera of North America
Insects described in 1851
Taxa named by Asa Fitch
Articles created by Qbugbot